Nari Hira is the owner of the Mumbai-based Magna Publishing Co. Ltd. that publishes magazines such as Stardust, Savvy, Showtime, Society and Health. He is also into film production through Magna Films, a subsidiary of his publishing company.

Nari Hira started his career working in an advertising agency. Later, he moved to the publishing business and started Magna Publishing. His first and largest success came through the magazine Stardust launched in 1971.

He also pioneered the video films genre in the 1980s by producing around 15 video films under his banner Hiba Films. The films did reasonably well and launched several well-known stars such as Aditya Pancholi and Urmila Matondkar. Most of these films were targeted for Adult viewers.

In 2007, he again got into the film production business through Magna Films, a subsidiary of his publication group. His first production was the 2008 film Bhram. He had a couple of films lined up for a 2009 release.

Movies Produced by Hiba Films
(selected list)

References

External links
 Magna Publishing
 

Indian publishers (people)
Film producers from Mumbai
Living people
Sindhi people
Year of birth missing (living people)